Palia Kalan is a city and a municipal board, near Lakhimpur city in Lakhimpur Kheri district in the Indian State of Uttar Pradesh.

It is also home to Dudhwa National Park, a wildlife park that boasts of rhinos, tigers, wild tuskers, the rare barking deer and many migratory birds. The flora and fauna is that of a typical marsh town, small lakes, elephant grass, etc.

Geography 
The river Sharda flows close to the town. Palia shares its boundaries with Mailani, Bhira, Khutar and Shahjahapur.

It have good 3 star Hotels with a full high class facility

Economy
Palia is a quick growing town of prosperous and rich Sikh farmers. And the main occupation is farming. Bajaj Hindusthan Limited (BHL) sugar plant, distillery and an eco-friendly plywood production unit. The sugar production plant is second largest sugar production unit in Asia and the plywood production plant is only second plant in the world which produces plywood with bio-gas. The objective of this new Unit was primarily to help the cane growers of the area supply their produce to the new location closer to their fields, thereby cutting down on transportation costs. The capacity was subsequently increased in stages to reach the present 11,000 TCD.

Demographics
, the total population of Palia Kalan was 41,126.

Transport 
Palia is connected to Lucknow through Uttar Pradesh State Highway 25  (UP SH 25) Palia - Lucknow Marg.

Lakhimpur Kheri Airport (also known as 'Palia Airport') is situated near Dudhwa National Park at Palia Kalan in Lakhimpur Kheri. This airstrip is for emergencies but it is usually used by politicians during an election period. Palia has been greatly affected by floods from the last few years.

The town is connected through a metre-gauge railway. It is currently undergoing construction to broaden the gauge.

See also
 Kheri (Lok Sabha constituency)
 Dhaurahra (Lok Sabha constituency)
 Dudhwa National Park

References

External links
 Government website

Cities and towns in Lakhimpur Kheri district